Pathanapuram is a Town in Pathanapuram Taluk Kollam district, Kerala, India. Pathanapuram is a part of Grama Panchayat and Block panchayat of same name and part of Kollam District Panchayat.

History

The history of Pathanapuram goes back to Thenmala Desam, a small Principality under a local ruler. Capital was at Pathanapuram. Later, Thenmala Desom became a part of Elayidathu Swaroopam having its capital at Kottarakkara. Pathanapuram was the capital of one of the two districts of Elayidathu Swaroopam.  In 1764,  King Marthandavarma conquered Elayidathu Swaroopam and annexed  it to Travancore.	
Most parts of Pathanapuram taluk were inhabited since before the Indus Valley civilization, and civilization may have existed in and around Pathanapuram  beginning  the 1st Century.   The name Pathanapuram may have evolved from the fact that the area had a sizeable elephant population and  elephants were caught and trained/tamed for work  at the elephant cage/camp at the Town.  The Old police station area used to  be the elephant Camp.   The name can be translated as Path =(10)+Ana = (elephant) + Puram = (Town)

Geography

Highlights 
India's first Rural IT park wholly owned by a startup came up at Pathanapuram. It is set up by a local entrepreneur named Varun Chandran through a startup named Corporate 360.

The park is specialised in Big data solutions.

Demographics

 census of India, Pathanapuram Panchayat had a population of 32,339. The total population constitute, 15,129 males and 17,210 females —a sex ratio of 1138 females per 1000 males. 3,052 children are in the age group of 0–6 years, of which 1,536 are boys and 1,516 are girls —a ratio of 987 per 1000. The average literacy rate stands at 92.94% with 27,218 literates.

Transport

The area is connected to the rest of the state by bus services of KSRTC and private buses. A KSRTC depot also situated in Pathanapuram. Three state highways namely Hill Highway, Main Eastern Highway and KP Road pass through the town. The Sabarimala bypass to Thiruvananthapuram starts at Pathanapuram and ends at Valakom.

Nearest airport is Trivandrum (80 km).

Politics
Pathanapuram assembly constituency is a part of the Mavelikkara Loksabha Constituency. Kodikunnil Suresh is the present member of parliament who won the 2019 Indian general election. Current M.L.A of Pathanapuram is actor turned politician K. B. Ganesh Kumar. He has won from this constituency in the 2001, 2006, 2011 as UDF Candidate and in 2016 and 2021 Assembly election as LDFCandidate .

Education
This is a list of educational institutions in Pathanapuram.

Indira Gandhi Memorial Vocational Higher Secondary School
Mohammaden Govt. HSS Edathara Pathanapuram.
Govt.Nadukkunnu UPS
Govt. Nedumparamp LPS pathanapuram
St. Stephen's HSS, Pathanapuram
Mount Tabor Girls HSS Pathanapuram
MTLPS Pathanapuram
Mount Tabor Training College Pathanapuram
Mother Susan EMLPS Pathanapuram
Al-Ameen Public School Pathanapuram
St.Mary's Senior Secondary School Pathanapuram
St.Stephen's College
University Institute Of Technology Pathanapuram
College of engineering Pathanapuram.
NADUKKUNNU High school

See also
Thinkalkarikkakom

References 

Geography of Kollam district